Richárd Erdős (Brno, 18 May 1881 – 9 June 1912, Frankfurt) was a Jewish Hungarian bass opera singer who was father of the American children's author Richard Erdoes.

Historical recordings
 Stars of Hungarian Opera, vol. 1, Hungaroton

References

19th-century Hungarian male opera singers
Operatic basses
1881 births
1912 deaths
20th-century Hungarian male opera singers
Austro-Hungarian singers